Limestone is a community in Victoria County, New Brunswick, Canada. Limestone is situated along the Saint John River, between Route 105 and Route 130.

History

Limestone was founded in 1898 as a flag station on the Canadian Pacific Railway.

See also
List of communities in New Brunswick

References

Communities in Victoria County, New Brunswick
New Brunswick populated places on the Saint John River (Bay of Fundy)